The 4th Brigade Combat Team, 1st Armored Division "Highlanders", is an armored brigade combat team (ABCT) of the 1st Armored Division, United States Army. The brigade is mechanized and its major combat equipment include the M1A2SEP Abrams tank, M2A3 & M3A3 Bradley infantry fighting vehicle, M109A6 Paladin howitzer, M1151 HMMWV and MRAP (armored vehicle).

As of 22 May 2012 its command personnel includes:
Commander: Colonel Chip Daniels
Command Sergeant Major: Command Sergeant Major Terry Weiss

Current organization
 4th Brigade Combat Team, 1st Armored Division consists of the following elements:
2nd Squadron, 13th Cavalry Regiment "Saber"
4th Battalion, 6th Infantry Regiment "Regulars"
1st Battalion, 77th Armor Regiment "Steel Tigers"
2nd Battalion, 29th Field Artillery Regiment "Pathfinders"
123rd Brigade Support Battalion "Iron Support"
2nd Engineer Battalion "Sapper Steel"

Insignia

Soldiers assigned to the brigade wear the shoulder sleeve insignia of the 1st Armored Division. Each brigade within the 1st Armored Division has created their own unique insignia in relation to their brigade nickname. The 4th Brigade's nickname is "The Highlander Brigade" and for that reason the 1st Armored Division Shoulder Sleeve insignia bearing the Arabic numeral 4 below the cannon and track symbols. The 4 is green, reminiscent of the second color of the Armor branch displayed on armor unit guidons. The shoulder sleeve insignia is that super imposed onto two crossed Scottish broadsword, weapons commonly associated with the highlands of Scotland.

The unit's nickname "Highlander" alludes to the West Texas highlands--Franklin Mountains (Texas)—surrounding Fort Bliss. Additionally, this is a historical reference to the 1st Armored Division's participation in campaigns across the North Apennine Mountains during World War II.

Unit history
4th BCT was organized in 2005 at Fort Bliss, Texas. It was originally part of the 1st Cavalry Division. The brigade reflagged to the 1st Armored Division on 4 March 2008. The first commander of the Highlander Brigade was Colonel Stephen Twitty. The unit is the first brigade combat team to be activated at Fort Bliss from the 1st Armored Division. The division will relocate to Fort Bliss in 2012 as a result of Base Realignment and Closure, 2005.

Operation Iraqi Freedom 

The entire brigade deployed to the Iraq War in May 2009. The brigade was to be the proof of principle unit for the Advise and Assist Brigade concept also known as Brigade Combat Team-Stability (BCT-S/BCT-A).  The 4th BCT, 1AD will focus on security force assistance during the deployment. The unit was planned to operate in the Southern Iraqi provinces of Al Muthanna, Dhi Qar, and Maysan.

Operation New Dawn 
In August 2011 4th Brigade deployed to Iraq. All of 4th Brigade's battalions were assigned to bases and forward operating bases in the north and west of Iraq except for 1st Battalion, 77th Armor Regiment, which was based in southern Iraq and was assigned as the theater wide Quick Reaction Force directly under United States Army Central/Third Army. When the governments of the United States and Iraq could not come to an agreement regarding immunity for US personnel in Iraq 4th Brigade was one of the last units to withdraw from Iraq as part of the closing of Operation New Dawn.

Operation Enduring Freedom 
Shortly after the brigade's return from Iraq in February 2012, members of the brigade were warned of another imminent deployment. 4th Brigade was selected by the Army as one of the new security forces advise and assist teams (SFAAT). These small teams would deployment to Afghanistan advising Afghan National Army and Afghan National Police command teams and staff from the battalion to corps level.

After a monthlong training rotation at the Joint Readiness Training Center, Ft Polk Louisiana Fort Polk the first of three groups of SFAATs deployed in May 2012. While soldiers were awarded the Purple Heart Purple Heart, no 4th Brigade soldiers died while deployed.

The 4th Brigade's commanding officer Colonel Terry Cook   returned with the last of the teams and the brigade colors in June 2013.

Inactivated Units 

On 10 June 2015, Special Troops Battalion "Strike Force" was inactivated and replaced with the 2nd Engineer Battalion "Sapper Steel"

References

  covers its first (World War II era) incarnation.
 "Campaign, War Service, & Unit Award Sreamers"
 "Sun Sets On Long Knife"

External links
 1st Armored Division Website 
 4th Brigade, 1st Armored Division Website 

001 04
Division 001 04
Armored Division 001 04